At Home was an early American television series which aired on New York City television station WCBW (now WCBS-TV) from 1944 to 1945. The series was a variety show, one of the first such series produced for American television. Very little is known about this series (such as the running time).

Format
The series presented variety acts. One episode, for example, featured comedian Bernie West, dancer Ronnie Cunningham, singer Vera Pandowsky, guitarist Youl Bryner, and was hosted by Paquita Anderson. A different episode featured dancer Sandra Barrett and juggler Senor Francisco.

Episode status
Methods to record live television did not exist until late 1947. As such, the series is most likely lost except possibly for still photographs.

References

External links
 At Home at IMDb

1944 American television series debuts
1945 American television series endings
1940s American variety television series
English-language television shows
Black-and-white American television shows
Lost television shows
American live television series